The  is an aquarium located in the ward of Minato in Osaka, Osaka Prefecture, Japan, near Osaka Bay. When it first opened, it was the largest public aquarium in the world. It is a member of the Japanese Association of Zoos and Aquariums.

The aquarium is about a five-minute walk from Osakako Station on the Osaka Municipal Subway Chūō Line, and is next to the Tempozan Ferris Wheel.

History

In 1988, with the aim of redeveloping the Osaka Bay Area, the Kaiyukan and Tempozan Marketplace were to be built following the success stories of aquariums and commercial facilities overseas.  The aquarium was named "Osaka Aquarium Kaiyukan" by the general public and opened in 1990. The number of visitors reached 1 million on the 40 days of the opening and 2 million on the 101 days, The final number of visitors during the year reached 5.6 million, surpassing the national record held at that time Tokyo Sea Life Park and being the fastest record in Japan.

The number of visitors reached 50 million on February 26, 2008. Achievement in 6317 days (about 18 years) is the fastest among aquariums in Japan, and about 60% of the visitors are repeaters. In 2014, the total number of visitors exceeded 65 million. In 2017, the number of visitors reached 75 million, making it the most visited aquarium in Japan.

Exhibits

Visitors will go up to the eighth floor on the escalator, passing through the Aqua Gate, a tunnel tank with various tropical fish.   After exiting the escalator is the Japan Forest, which recreates a Japanese forest and holds Asian small-clawed otters, Japanese giant salamanders, black-crowned night herons and many other native freshwater animals.

The walk-through aquarium displays marine life in several habitats comprising 27 tanks in 16 main exhibits with a total volume of 10,941 tons of water. The habitats are from the Ring of Fire area of the Pacific Ocean and these include the Aleutian Islands (tufted puffins), Monterey Bay (California sea lions and largha seals), Gulf of Panama (ring-tailed coati, long-spine porcupinefish and blotcheye soldierfish), Ecuador Rain Forest (arapaima, red-bellied piranhas, capybara & green iguanas), Antarctica (Adélie, gentoo & king penguins), Tasman Sea (Pacific white-sided dolphins) and Great Barrier Reef (palette surgeonfish, pennant coralfish & threadfin butterflyfish), Seto Inland Sea (common octopus, Japanese spiny lobster & red seabream), Coast of Chile (Japanese anchovies and South American pilchards), Cook Sea Strait (loggerhead sea turtles, deepwater burrfish & scarlet wrasse), Japan Deeps (Japanese spider crabs, elephant fish & Hilgendorf's saucord) and a jellyfish gallery (moon jellyfish & northern sea nettle).

The largest single pane measures six meters by five meters by thirty centimeters and weighs roughly 10 tons. At the thicknesses used, regular glass would be unwieldy and would not have the desired transparency.

The most popular animals on display are the whale sharks. In 1990, the Okinawa Ocean Expo Aquarium (predecessor of Okinawa Churaumi Aquarium), were the first in the world to whale sharks in captivity, but did not exhibit them. At that time, the Osaka Aquarium was the only facility in the world that owned whale sharks. In 1994 the aquarium successfully captivated a manta ray which was the second in the world at the time. Later in 1995 the aquarium managed to successfully hold an ocean sunfish in captivity.

The "New Interactive Area" that opened in 2013 allows visitors to see the animals up close and possibly touch them. In the "New Interactive Area", 3 zones are constructed, the Arctic Zone, in which visitors see ringed seals, Falkland Islands Zone, where they can see southern rockhopper penguins, and the Maldives Zone, in which they can directly touch stingrays and small sharks like brownbanded bamboo sharks and coral catsharks.

In 2020, the museum shop was reopened on February 22 after renewal work was carried out to coincide with the 30th anniversary of its opening.

Research and conservation 
Osaka Aquarium are focusing on research on sharks and Rays. By 2016, Kaiyukan had successfully captivity or breeding 47 species of sharks, 37 species of rays, and 1 species of ghost shark, for a total of 85 species.

although it was not exhibited at the aquarium, they succeeded in captivity of Pelagic thresher for 26 days at the Research Center in Iburi, Kochi Prefecture. Other captivity such as Chilean devil ray, which has not been recorded since Georgia Aquarium captivity in Taiwan, was also successful at the research center.
In 2001, the aquarium published a research book at the Research Center, publishing the knowledge accumulated by the Osaka aquarium over 10 years on 567 species of fish in 136 families. The research book later received the Kochi Prefecture Academic Publishing Award.

In addition, since the opening of the Osaka Aquarium, it has succeeded in breeding Spotted Seal, Pelagic stingray, California Sealion, Sea otter, etc., and received the breeding award from the Japanese Association of Zoos and Aquariums. aquariums also focusing on breeding and cultivation other than aquatic organisms, and in 1993, aquariums received the breeding award from the association for the first successful breeding of the spur-winged lapwing in Japan. In addition, about 200 species of plants are exhibited in the Japanese forest area inside the building.

Research and conservation will be reported in Bulletin "kaiyu(かいゆう)".

Architecture and name 
The Kaiyukan's conceptual design, architecture, and exhibit design was led by Peter Chermayeff of Peter Chermayeff LLC while at Cambridge Seven Associates. Peter Chermayeff also builds the Lisbon Oceanarium and other buildings.

TV personality Emiko Kaminuma states that it is her role to decide the name "海遊館 Kaiyukan" in Japanese.  Kaminuma, who was a member of the name selection committee among the common candidates starting from Marin, chose Kaiyukan, which had only one vote, and said, "It is better to make it an impactful'Kaiyukan'". Emiko Kaminuma said, "There is no impact with a mundane name that starts with Marin. If you express it in three kanji characters, the meaning will be easier to understand, and it will have an easy-to-understand impact like  (夢工場).  There is. "  As a result, it was not named after Marine, which has a large number of votes, but was named Kaiyukan.

Gallery
Aqua gate

penguins

Tasmanian Sea tank

The Pacific Ocean tank

Japanese Trench tank

Maldives sea pour

Jellyfish Zone

See also
Mount Tenpō
Tempozan Ferris Wheel

Notes

External links

  

Aquaria in Japan
Tourist attractions in Osaka
Buildings and structures in Osaka
Zoos established in 1990
1990 establishments in Japan